The 1899 All-Ireland Senior Football Championship Final was the twelfth All-Ireland Final and the deciding match of the 1899 All-Ireland Senior Football Championship, an inter-county Gaelic football tournament for the top teams in Ireland. 

Dublin, represented by the Geraldines club, were the winners. Cork were represented by the Nils club.

Dublin led 1-7 to 0-2 at half time. 

It was the sixth of six All-Ireland football titles won by Dublin in the 1890s.

References

final
All-Ireland Senior Football Championship Finals
Cork county football team matches
Dublin county football team matches